Daniel Godelli (born January 10, 1992 in Peqin) is an Albanian weightlifter, and Olympian competing in the 69 kg and 77 kg categories until 2018 and 81 kg starting in 2018 after the International Weightlifting Federation reorganized the categories.

He has won various medals, most notably the gold medal at the 2014 World Championship in Almaty, but his results at Almaty were later disqualified due to testing positive for doping.

Career
The most notable achievement during Godelli's youth activities was winning the gold medal on the World Junior Championships in 2011. In this year, also he won bronze medal at 2011 European Weightlifting Championships in Kazan.

In 2013 he won a silver (big) medal in the 2013 European Weightlifting Championships in Tirana, Albania. He had silver in Snatch and gold in Clean&Jerk.

In 2014 he repeated himself with a silver (big) medal, but in the 77 kg category, and lost the gold medal to Erkand Qerimaj only for a slightly heavier body weight, as he had lifted the same combined weight as Qerimaj, 349 kg.

He initially won a gold medal at the 2014 World Weightlifting Championships in the 77 kg category, and in doing so became Albania's first World Champion. The results were later disqualified as Godelli failed an anti-doping test for the steroid Stanozolol, as a result he was banned from competition until December 10 2016.

Major results

References

External links
 

1992 births
Living people
Albanian male weightlifters
Olympic weightlifters of Albania
Weightlifters at the 2012 Summer Olympics
Sportspeople from Elbasan

Mediterranean Games gold medalists for Albania
Competitors at the 2013 Mediterranean Games
Mediterranean Games medalists in weightlifting
European Weightlifting Championships medalists
World Weightlifting Championships medalists
21st-century Albanian people